Bungin Island is located in Alas District, Sumbawa Regency, West Nusa Tenggara in Indonesia. The island is situated within Bali Sea, 70 kilometers west of the center of Sumbawa Besar sub-district. The island is administratively one of the villages in the district. The island is mostly inhabited by the  Bajo Tribe from South Sulawesi, who arrived here more than 200 years ago. With an area of around 8.5 hectares where about 3,400 people live. The island is connected by a causeway to the mainland of the regency. The island is one of the most densely populated island in the world.

References 

Tourism in Indonesia
West Nusa Tenggara
Islands of West Nusa Tenggara